The Budapest Trophy is a senior- and junior-level figure skating competition held in Budapest, Hungary. The inaugural event was part of the 2020–21 ISU Challenger Series.  Medals may be awarded in men's singles, ladies' singles, pairs, and ice dance on the senior and junior levels.

Senior medalists 
CS: ISU Challenger Series

Men

Ladies

Pairs

Ice dance

Junior medalists

Men

Ladies

Pairs

Ice dance

References 

Budapest Trophy
ISU Challenger Series
International figure skating competitions hosted by Hungary